The Hermitage cats are a group of cats residing in the Hermitage Museum in Saint Petersburg, Russia. The museum has a press secretary dedicated to the cats, and three people act as caretakers. The cats live in the museum's basement, and they also appear on the embankment and on the square during the summer. In previous eras, they roamed throughout the museum galleries.

In 2010, Maria Khaltunen (also "Khaltunin" or "Haltunen"), who directs the museum's cat programme, stated that there were 60 cats on the museum grounds, even though the staff has a joke that officially the museum is only supposed to have 50 cats. Irina Popovets, who became the head of the cat department, stated that the cats were "as well-known as our collections".

In May 2013, the count had grown to 74 cats, of both sexes (but neutered), according to Haltunen.  There are kitchens for preparing their food ("they all have different preferences"), and even a small hospital.

As of 2013, donations (a €400-per-month payment from the charity Pro Animale, and the sponsorship of Royal Canin) fund the presence of the cats.

History 
The cats were present in the museum, originally a palace, since the 18th century; in 1745, Elizabeth of Russia ordered cats to be placed in the palace in order to control the mice. James Rodgers of the BBC stated that the belief is that the cats originated from Kazan, a city known for having cats good at catching mice. The cats remained in St. Petersburg except during World War II, when the existing cat population was killed. A new group of cats replaced the previous cats, since the rat population had increased.

In the late 1990s, Khaltunen began a programme to care for the cats, which previously lived in poor conditions. As of 2007, the museum began adopting cats needing homes.

In 2011, the museum began a "Catfest", a celebration of its cat population. "Catfest" has included cat painting contests and scavenger hunts for children.

Beginning in 2015, because of the number of visiting tourists, a website has been set up by the museum for people who may be interested in adopting a cat. "It is an honor to adopt a Hermitage cat", one potential cat owner was told.

See also 
Other cats kept to deter mice in public buildings include:
 Canadian Parliamentary Cats
 Chief Mouser to the Cabinet Office, United Kingdom
 Tibs the Great kept by the Royal Mail in the UK.
 List of individual cats

References

Further reading
 The Hermitage Museum and Maria Haltunen, The Hermitage Cats: Treasures from the State Hermitage Museum, St Petersburg. Unicorn Press Limited, 5 July 2015. , 9781910065662. Google Books profile.

External links
 Hermitage Cats 

Hermitage Museum
Cats
History of Saint Petersburg
Fauna of Russia